John James McGuinness (1857 – December 19, 1916) was an Irish professional baseball player. He played in three seasons in Major League Baseball, 1876 for the New York Mutuals, 1879 for the Syracuse Stars, and 1884 for the Philadelphia Keystones of the Union Association. He was mostly used as a first baseman.

Sources

Major League Baseball first basemen
New York Mutuals players
Syracuse Stars (NL) players
Philadelphia Keystones players
Binghamton Crickets (1870s) players
Utica (minor league baseball) players
Binghamton Bingoes players
Major League Baseball players from Ireland
Irish baseball players
Irish emigrants to the United States (before 1923)
1857 births
1916 deaths
19th-century baseball players